is a Japanese field hockey player. He competed at the 1960 Summer Olympics and the 1964 Summer Olympics.

References

External links
 

1939 births
Living people
Japanese male field hockey players
Olympic field hockey players of Japan
Field hockey players at the 1960 Summer Olympics
Field hockey players at the 1964 Summer Olympics
Sportspeople from Tokyo
20th-century Japanese people